"N.E. Heart Break" is a song performed by American R&B quintet New Edition. The song serves as the fifth and final single from their sixth studio album Heart Break (1988).

"N.E. Heart Break" peaked at number 13 on the Billboard R&B singles chart. The music video for the song depicts the group members riding mopeds after finishing their Heart Break tour. The music video featured cameos from Malcolm Jamal Warner (who also directed the video), Heavy D & The Boyz (The group's labelmate), Shanice Wilson, The Boys, Robert Townsend, Rob Stone, and Brooke Payne, who also appeared in the "If It Isn't Love" video. The version of the song featured in the music video is the single version of the Extended Club remix, rather than the one featured on the studio album.

Personnel
Ronnie DeVoe: lead vocals and background vocals
Ricky Bell: lead vocals and background vocals
Michael Bivins: background vocals, rap
Ralph Tresvant: lead vocals & background vocals
Johnny Gill: lead vocals and background vocals

1988 songs
1989 singles
New Edition songs
Songs written by Jimmy Jam and Terry Lewis
Song recordings produced by Jimmy Jam and Terry Lewis
MCA Records singles